The 2009–10 Euroleague was the 10th season of the professional basketball competition for elite clubs throughout Europe, organised by Euroleague Basketball Company, and it was the 53rd season of the premier competition for European men's clubs overall. The regular season featured 24 teams from 13 countries.

This season marked the first time since 2001–02 season that a qualifying round was used to determine the last two teams for the regular season. The qualifying round started on September 29, 2009, while the regular season of the Euroleague started on October 15, 2010. The season ended with the Euroleague Final Four, which was hosted at the Palais Omnisports de Paris-Bercy in Paris, France, with the final on May 9, 2010.

Format 
For the first time in the modern Euroleague era, a preliminary stage was used to determine the last two teams in the regular season. 8 teams competed in qualification rounds, of which the 2 winners advanced to the regular season stage. Those teams joined 22 teams that had qualified directly to the regular season stage.

Allocation 
A maximum of three teams could qualify from any one country through their league position. However, 14 clubs held Euroleague Basketball A-linceces, which gave them automatic spots in the Euroleague Regular Season until 2011–12, regardless of their domestic league finish. These licenses were granted via a formula that considers each team's performance in its domestic league and the Euroleague, the television revenues Euroleague Basketball collects from its home country and the team's home attendance.
A-licence holders
 Spain: Caja Laboral, Real Madrid, Regal FC Barcelona, Unicaja
 Italy: Montepaschi Siena, Lottomatica Roma
 Greece: Olympiacos, Panathinaikos
 Russia: CSKA Moscow
 Turkey: Efes Pilsen, Fenerbahçe Ülker
 Lithuania: Žalgiris
 Israel: Maccabi Electra Tel Aviv
 France: ASVEL (qualifying round)
The rest of the field was filled with teams that qualified through their performance in their respective national leagues and wild card invitations.

Teams 
The labels in the parentheses show how each team qualified for the place of its starting round (TH: Euroleague title holders):
 A: Qualified through an A–licence
 1st, 2nd, etc.: League position after Playoffs
 QR: Qualifying rounds
 WC: Wild card
 EC: Champion of the 2008–09 Eurocup Basketball

Qualifying rounds

First preliminary round 
Games were played on September 29 and October 2. Winners advanced to the second preliminary round, while losers parachuted into the Eurocup.

|}

Second preliminary round 
Game 1 of each match was played on October 6. Game 2 of the Benetton Treviso-Entente Orléanaise match was played on October 9, and Game 2 of Maroussi-Alba Berlin was played on October 11. The winners of each match advanced to the Regular Season, with the losers parachuting into the Eurocup.

|}

Regular season 
The Regular Season began on October 15, 2009 and concluded on January 14, 2010.

If teams were level on record at the end of the Regular Season, tiebreakers were applied in the following order:
 Head-to-head record.
 Head-to-head point differential.
 Point differential during the Regular Season.
 Points scored during the regular season.
 Sum of quotients of points scored and points allowed in each Regular Season match.

Top 16 
The survivors from the Regular Season advanced to the Top 16, where they were drawn into four groups of four teams each, playing home-and-home from January 27 through March 11. The draw was held at Euroleague headquarters in Barcelona, starting at 13:00 CET on January 18, and was streamed live on the official Euroleague site.

Quarterfinals 

Team 1 hosted Games 1 and 2, plus Game 5 if necessary. Team 2 hosted Game 3, and Game 4 if necessary.

Final four

Individual statistics

Rating

Points

Rebounds

Assists

Other Stats

Game highs

Awards

Euroleague 2009–10 MVP 
  Miloš Teodosić (  Olympiacos)

Euroleague 2009–10 Final Four MVP 
  Juan Carlos Navarro (  Regal FC Barcelona)

All-Euroleague Team 2009–10

Rising Star 
  Ricky Rubio (  Regal FC Barcelona)

Best Defender 
  Victor Khryapa (  CSKA Moscow)

Top Scorer (Alphonso Ford Trophy) 
  Linas Kleiza (  Olympiacos)

Coach of the Year (Alexander Gomelsky Award) 
  Xavier Pascual (  Regal FC Barcelona)

Club Executive of the Year 
  Przemyslaw Seczkowski (  Asseco Prokom Gdynia)

MVP Weekly

Regular season

Top 16

Quarter-finals

MVP of Month

Attendance figures

References and notes

External links 

 Euroleague.net Official Site
 Eurobasket.com Euroleague Page
 ULEB.net Official Site

 
 
EuroLeague seasons